Loilem Township is a township of Loilem District in the Shan State of Myanmar. The principal town is Loilem. In 2018, the Myanmar Army was accused of committing war crimes in the township. In November 2019, police destroyed several acres of poppy plantations in the township.

References 

Townships of Shan State
Loilen District